Qafarli may refer to:
Qafarlı, Azerbaijan
Qəfərli, Azerbaijan